The women's pole vault at the 1998 European Athletics Championships was held at the Népstadion on 18 and 21 August. The event was for the first time inducted into the European Outdoor Championships.

Medalists

Results

Qualification
Qualification: Qualification Performance 4.15 (Q) or at least 12 best performers advance to the final.

Final

References

Results
Results
Results
Video

Pole vault
Pole vault at the European Athletics Championships
1998 in women's athletics